Señorita 89 is a Mexican streaming television created by Lucía Puenzo. It premiered on 27 February 2022 on Pantaya in the United States and Starzplay in Latin America.

Cast

Main 
 Ilse Salas as Concepción
 Ximena Romo as Elena
 Bárbara López as Dolores (Miss Guerrero)
 Natasha Dupeyron as Isabel (Miss Yucatán)
 Leidi Gutiérrez as Jocelyn (Miss Chihuahua)
 Coty Camacho as Ángeles (Miss Oaxaca)

Recurring 
 Edwarda Gurrola as Luisa
 Marcelo Alonso
 Juan Manuel Bernal
 Luis Ernesto Franco
 Ianis Guerrero as Antonio
 Ari Brickman as Valenzuela Helú
 Mónica del Carmen as Licha
 Mabel Cadena as Nora
 Aida López as Dr. Franco
 Getsemani Vela as Marijó (Miss Guanajuato)

Episodes

Production

Development 
On 3 August 2020, Señorita México was announced as one of Starz's first international original series for its Starzplay streaming service. On 29 April 2021, it was announced that filming had begun and that the series title had been changed to Señorita 89. On 23 December 2021, it was announced that the series would premiere on 27 February 2022. On 12 October 2022, the series was renewed for a second season.

Casting 
On 29 April 2021, the complete cast was announced.

Awards and nominations

References

External links 
 

Spanish-language television shows
2020s Mexican drama television series
2022 Mexican television series debuts
Television series about beauty pageants
Television series by Fremantle (company)